Şatırhüyük is a village in the Nurdağı District, Gaziantep Province, Turkey. It is inhabited by Alevi Turks and Sunni Kurds and had a population of 2828 in 2022.

References

Towns in Turkey
Nurdağı District
Kurdish settlements in Gaziantep Province